Cameraria pongamiae is a moth of the family Gracillariidae. It is known from Malaysia (Negeri Sembilan, Pahang, Sabah), the Philippines (Luzon, Palawan) and Taiwan.

The wingspan is 3.8-4.8 mm.

The larvae feed on Pongamia pinnata. They mine the leaves of their host plant. The mine has the form of an oval or elliptical blotch mine occurring upon the upper side of the leaf, usually on the leaf vein. It is flat and somewhat transparent through the upper epidermis at a young stage, then discoloured into white and deformed into a tentiform type with a finely shrunk upper epidermis at maturity. Pupation takes place inside the mine-cavity without a particular cocoon. More than ten mines may be found on a single leaflet.

References

Cameraria (moth)

Leaf miners
Moths of the Philippines
Moths of Malaysia
Moths of Taiwan
Moths described in 1993
Taxa named by Tosio Kumata